Dracontioides desciscens is a plant species in the family Araceae. It is endemic to eastern Brazil (States of Pernambuco, Bahia, Espírito Santo).

References

Endemic flora of Brazil
Lasioideae
Plants described in 1859